Kazakhstan competed at the 2022 Winter Paralympics in Beijing, China which took place between 4–13 March 2022. In total, five athletes competed in two sports.

Medalists

The following Kazakh competitors won medals at the games. In the discipline sections below, the medalists' names are bolded.

| width="56%" align="left" valign="top" |

| width="22%" align="left" valign="top" |

Competitors
The following is the list of number of competitors participating at the Games per sport/discipline.

Biathlon

Kazakhstan competed in biathlon.

Men

Cross-country skiing

Kazakhstan competed in cross-country skiing.

Men

Relay

See also
Kazakhstan at the Paralympics
Kazakhstan at the 2022 Winter Olympics

References

Nations at the 2022 Winter Paralympics
2022
Winter Paralympics